Oracle Multimedia (formerly Oracle interMedia from versions 8 to 10gR2) is a feature available for Oracle databases, which provides multimedia utilities in a database environment, generating as a result a multimedia database (MMDB).
Oracle Multimedia was deprecated in Oracle 18c and desupported in Oracle 19c.

Functionalities 
Oracle Multimedia is a framework which:
 as a general-purpose feature enables the management and retrieval of image, audio, and video data
 recognizes the most popular multimedia formats and can automate metadata extraction and basic image-processing
 facilitates the development of multimedia applications using JSPs, servlets, PL/SQL (with new packages) or tools such as JDeveloper (ADF/UIX) and Oracle Portal.

Oracle Multimedia manages multimedia data within an Oracle database under transaction control (see transaction processing); using by default database schemas named ORDSYS and ORDPLUGINS (the "ORD" prefix designates "object-relational data").

ORDSYS provides four media classes:
ORDAudio
ORDDoc
ORDImage
ORDVideo

Alternatively, an Oracle database can use Oracle Multimedia to store and index meta-information together with external references that enable efficient access to media-content stored outside the database.

References

See also 
 Oracle Spatial and Graph

Proprietary database management systems
Oracle software